Athetis hospes, or Porter's rustic, is a moth of the family Noctuidae which was described by Christian Friedrich Freyer in 1835. It is found in Spain, southern France, Italy, on the Balkan Peninsula, Crete, Turkey and northern Iran. The species seems to be expanding its range in north-western Europe with records from Great Britain and the Netherlands.

Technical description and variation

P. hospes Frr. (= uliginosa H.-Sch. nec Bsd., lepigone Roesel nec Moeschl.). Forewing glossy ochreous washed with rufous, the veins grey dotted with dark; lines obscure; the inner waved, toothed with black points inwards on the veins; outer line dentate lunulate with black and grey points on the veins; orbicular a blackish point; reniform a small dark lunule, from which an ochreous streak runs to termen above vein 5; terminal spots black; hindwing whitish with the apical area brownish; the tufts of hair on tibiae and abdomen yellow. Larva greyish yellow, whitish beneath; dorsal line whitish; subdorsal and spiracular lines redbrown;spiracles yellow ringed with black; head brown. The wingspan is 26–30 mm.

Biology
Adults are on wing from May to June and again from August to September.

The larvae feed on various low-growing plants, including tobacco. The species overwinters as full-grown larvae in the soil. They are gregarious in the first instar. Later instars make galleries in the stalks and holes in the leaves. Pupation takes place below ground near the host plant

References

External links
Athetis hospes on European Butterflies and Moths
Lepiforum.de

Acronictinae
Moths described in 1831
Moths of Asia
Moths of Europe
Taxa named by Christian Friedrich Freyer